Galium × pomeranicum is a species of plants in the family Rubiaceae, named for the region historically called Pomerania, now divided between Germany and Poland. The plant is apparently of hybrid origin, a cross between G. album × G. verum, though established in the wild. It is widespread across most of Europe and sparingly naturalized in a few locations in North America (New York, Massachusetts, Connecticut and New Brunswick).

References

External links
Tela Botanica, Gaillet de Poméranie
Wilde Planten in Nederland en Belgie, Geelwit walstro
Naturgate, LuntoPorti (Helsinki Finland), upright bedstraw
Czech  Botany, svízel pomořanský / lipkavec pomoranský
Aphotoglora, David Fenwick, hybrid bedstraw

pomeranicum
Hybrid plants
Flora of Europe
Flora of Connecticut
Flora of Massachusetts
Flora of New Brunswick
Flora of New York (state)
Plants described in 1795
Taxa named by Anders Jahan Retzius